Yahoo! Games was a section of the Yahoo! website, launched on March 31, 1998, in which Yahoo! users could play games either with other users or by themselves. The majority of Yahoo! Games was closed down on March 31, 2014 and the balance was closed on February 9, 2016. Yahoo! announced that "changes in supporting technologies and increased security requirements for our own Yahoo! web pages, made it impossible to keep the games running safely and securely". It was then announced by Yahoo! that its Games section would be dissolved completely on May 13, 2016. However, the Yahoo! Games service is still available on Yahoo! Japan, along with Yahoo! Auctions.

Features
The games on the web site were typically Java applets or quick Flash games, although some titles required a local download. Many of the games that required a download contained TryMedia Adware. Yahoo! Games also included Yahoo! Video Games, which provides news, previews, and reviews of currently available or upcoming First Party games–and Yahoo! Games on Demand–which provided free demos and full-size downloads of full PC games for a charge.

The site featured an "All Star" system for users, in which a user could pay to get an All Star username.  All Star users were able to get extra privileges on Yahoo! Games sites such as disabling pop-up ads. All Star users did not have playable games without downloading.

Yahoo! Games was built on Yahoo!'s acquisition of ClassicGames.com (created by Internet entrepreneur Joel Comm and programmer Eron Jokipii) in 1997. The last used Yahoo! Video Games section of the site was formerly known as Games Domain, from back when Yahoo! acquired the web site in 2003.  As of May 14, 2016, Yahoo! Games held over 1,400 games, most of which were developed externally.

Games

Board games
Playable online (PO), Downloadable (D), Mobile (M), Skill (S)

Backgammon PO
Bingo PO
Catan D
Checkers PO
Chess PO
Chessmaster Challenge D
Chester S
Chinese Checkers PO
Dominos PO, M
Dots PO
Emperor's Moh Jong D
Go PO
JigWords D, PO
Jigsaw: Great Art D
Jigsaw: Landscapes D
Jigsaw: Medley D
Jigsaw: Pet D
Car Games
Literati PO
Luxor Mahjong D
Mah Jong PO
Mah Jong Adventures D
Mah Jong Garden D
Mah Jong Jade Expedition D
Mah Jong Medly D, PO
Mah Jong Towers Eternity D, PO
Mah-Jomino D
Mahjong Escape D, PO
Mahjong Match D
Mahjong Treasure S
Mahjong Fortuna S
Midas Mahjong S
Monopoly 3 D
Naval Command PO
Poker Pop D, PO
Reversi PO
Saints and Sinners Bingo D, PO
Sudoko: Latin Squares D
Super Mah Jong D
Word Slinger D

Up until March 2014, Yahoo! Games included a popular Internet chess server. Ten years earlier, in 2004, James Eade had recommended Yahoo! Chess as the best of Internet chess, writing that "action is to be found there at all times".  Yahoo! Chess differed from more contemporary Internet chess servers in its complete lack of oversight regarding user conduct or chess engine use.

Card games
Playable online (PO), Downloadable (D), Mobile (M), Skill (S)

Addiction Solitaire D, PO
Aloha Solitaire D, PO
Aloha TriPeaks D, PO
Ancient 4 in 1 GamePak D
Ancient Hearts and Spades D
Ancient Tri-Jong D
Ancient Tripeaks D
Blackjack PO
Canasta PO
Contract Bridge PO
Cribbage PO
Deuces Wild Video Poker PO
Double Down Video Poker PO
Euchre PO
Five Card Deluxe D, PO
Freecell Solitaire D PO
Gin PO
Go Fish PO
Golf Solitaire D, PO
Go-Stop PO, S
Hearts PO, M
Hold 'Em Poker PO
Honey Combo S
Hotel Solitaire D
Klondike Solitaire D, PO
Pinochle PO
Poker Superstars II D, PO
Pyramid S
Pyramids PO, M
Sheepshead PO
Solitaire 13 D, PO
Spades PO
Super Solitaire D
Super Solitaire 2 D
Tornado 21 PO, M
Turbo Solitaire D, PO

Other games
Playable online (PO), Downloadable (D), Mobile (M), Skill (S)

 Mushroomer PO
 Pac-Man D
 Pool PO
 TextTwist D, PO
 Tradewinds D
 Tradewinds 2 D, PO
 Tradewinds Legends D, PO
 Word Racer PO
 Yahoo! Graffiti PO
 Yahoo! Towers PO
 Treasure Hunt 2D, PO

In popular culture 
Yahoo! Chess was the subject of a song by the British rock band Half Man Half Biscuit on their 2008 album CSI:Ambleside. Entitled "Bad Losers on Yahoo! Chess", the song references a fictitious player, Dennis Bell of Torquay, Devon, who on losing a chess game signs out from the Yahoo! Chess server "Good game, Sir, do you want another bout? But Dennis ain't replying 'cos he's just signed out." The song also references Deep Blue.

See also
MSN Games
PlayOK

References

Bibliography
Eade, James (2004). The Chess Player's Bible:  Illustrated Strategies for Staying Ahead of the Game.
 http://www.usgamer.net/articles/yahoo-games-shutting-down-in-may-ending-a-major-piece-of-game-history

Browser-based game websites
Internet properties disestablished in 2016
Online video game services
Video game news websites
Games
Yahoo!